Oasis is a short lived CITV drama series which was about a group of children who ran an inner city farm. It is best known for featuring John Simm and Dean Gaffney. It was set in a wasteland site in south London.

The drama series ran from 5 January to 9 March 1993 for 10 episodes, made by Zenith North, the team behind Byker Grove for Carlton; their first children's drama series for the ITV network.

Cast
Peter McNamara - Jimmy Cadogan
Ray Armstrong - Graham Robbins
Sarah Carver - Jane Durant
Daniel John - Ian Finton
George Russo - Johnny Mandell
John Simm - Posh Robert
Kelly Frost - Skates
Bill Stewart - Bulger
Peter Russell - Leonard
Dean Gaffney - Mickey Drake
 Daniel Brown - Georgie McNiven

External links
 Oasis on the BFI database
 

1990s British children's television series
1993 British television series debuts
1993 British television series endings
ITV children's television shows
Fictional farms
Television shows set in London
Television series by ITV Studios
English-language television shows
Carlton Television